Joan Noureddine Oumari (born 19 August 1988) is a professional footballer who plays as a centre-back for the Lebanon national team.

After playing for eight seasons in Germany, between the fifth and second division, Oumari moved to Turkish side Sivasspor in 2016. In 2017, he signed for UAE Pro-League club Al-Nasr, before moving on a six-month loan to Japanese side Sagan Tosu the following season. After returning to Al-Nasr for one year, Oumari moved back to Japan in 2019, playing for Vissel Kobe, FC Tokyo and Sagan Tosu.

Born in Germany, Oumari has represented Lebanon internationally since 2013. He has played in the 2019 AFC Asian Cup, Lebanon's first participation in the competition through qualification.

Early life 
Oumari was born on 19 August 1988 in Berlin, Germany, to Lebanese Kurds from Beirut. Oumari's parents emigrated from Lebanon to Germany in 1980 due to the Lebanese Civil War. He has two brothers, Ahmed and Hassan; the latter also plays football.

Club career

Early career in Berlin
After a few years in the youth department, he moved to the youth section of Reinickendorfer Füchse. There, he made the leap to the first team during the 2006–07 season, which was playing in the fifth division (Verbandsliga Berlin). Oumari played 22 league games that season, scoring one goal, and finished in third place. The following season, Oumari established himself as a regular player, playing 31 out of 33 league games, and scoring five goals. At the end of the season, his team came first in the league with the fewest goals conceded.

SV Babelsberg 03
The following season Joan Oumari, alongside his older brother Hassan, who also played regularly for Reinickendorfer Füchse, moved to Regionalliga side SV Babelsberg 03. While his older brother was only used sporadically, Joan Oumari played in about half of the season games, mostly as a substitute.

During the 2009–10 season, Oumari only played 11 league games. His best performance was on 5 March 2010, in 3–0 home win over ZFC Meuselwitz, where he gave two assists and was declared the man of the match. At the end of the season, his team came first with the fewest goals conceded in the league and were promoted to the 3.Liga. There, Oumari became a regular; initially deployed as a left-back, Oumari was later moved as a center-back.

Rot-Weiß Erfurt and FSV Frankfurt 
In May 2011, Rot-Weiss Erfurt announced the signing of Oumari on a two-year deal. In his first season he immediately took a regular place in central defence and played 29 league games. After another year in the third division, Oumari made the jump to the 2. Bundesliga, moving to FSV Frankfurt in the summer of 2013.

Sivasspor
During the winter transfer window of the 2015–16 season, Oumari moved to Turkish side Sivasspor. His first game for the club came on 16 January 2016, as a starter in a 3–1 away loss to Galatasaray. On his last game in the season, Oumari scored a goal against Fenerbahce on 19 May 2016 in a 2–2 draw. However, the draw wasn't enough as his team was relegated to the TFF First League. Oumari played a total of 17 games in the Süper Lig during his first season.

In his six-month stay in the TFF First League, Oumari played 13 league matches and scored one goal, on 10 December 2016 against Göztepe.

Al-Nasr

2017–18: First two seasons 
On 3 January 2017, Oumari moved to UAE Pro-League side Al-Nasr SC on a two-and-a-half-year deal. He played 32 league games in his first two seasons at the club.

2018: Loan to Sagan Tosu
In August 2018 Oumari signed for J1 League side Sagan Tosu on a six-month loan, becoming the first Lebanese player to play in the J1 League. His first and only goal for the club came on 20 October 2018 against Vegalta Sendai in a 2–3 away win. Oumari played a total of 11 league games for the club.

2018–19: Third season 
Upon returning from loan to Al-Nasr, Oumari played nine league games in the 2018–19 season, as well as one cup game. He also debuted in the AFC Champions League, playing against Pakhtakor Tashkent in the 2019 play-off round.

Vissel Kobe
On 23 July 2019, J1 League side Vissel Kobe announced the signing of Oumari on a free transfer. He made his club debut on 17 August 2019, in a 3–0 home win against Urawa Red Diamonds in the league. He scored his only goal for Vissel Kobe on 19 October 2019, in a 1–3 home defeat against his eventual future club FC Tokyo. Oumari ended the 2019 season with one goals in four appearances in the league. He also made one appearance in the 2019 Emperor's Cup, which he won as his side defeated Kashima Antlers 2–0 in the final.

FC Tokyo

2020 season 
On 10 January 2020, Oumari joined J1 League runners-up FC Tokyo. His debut came on 12 July 2020 in the league, coming on as a substitute in a 3–1 away win against Yokohama F. Marinos. Oumari's debut from the starting lineup came two matchdays later, on 22 July, in a 1–1 draw against Consadole Sapporo. On 10 October, in a match against Gamba Osaka, Oumari lost a tooth in an aerial duel. Oumari's first goal came on 19 December in the final matchday of the 2020 J1 League, scoring the sole goal of the game against his former club Vissel Kobe. 

On 4 January 2021, Oumari played in the 2020 J.League Cup final, helping FC Tokyo win 2–1 against Kashiwa Reysol. He finished the season with 19 games: 12 in the league, one in the league cup, and six in the AFC Champions League. On 10 February 2021, Oumari's contract was extended for a further year.

2021 season 
Oumari scored his first goal of the 2021 season on 25 August 2021, opening the scoring with a header in a 2–1 win against Vegalta Sendai. He left the club on 5 December 2021, following the expiration of his contract.

Return to Sagan Tosu 
After Oumari's contract expired with FC Tokyo, Sagan Tosu signed him on a free transfer on 25 February 2022. After having played only one league game and three cup games, Oumari terminated his contract with Sagan Tosu on mutual consent on 21 August.

International career

Oumari made his debut for Lebanon on 7 September 2013, under coach Giuseppe Giannini, in a friendly against Syria. He came on as a substitute in the 55th minute and, seven minutes later, received a direct red card. Giannini excluded Oumari from the national team, who played his next game in 2015 under Miodrag Radulović.

Oumari's first goal for Lebanon came on 12 November 2015, scoring a 30-meter volley against Laos in the 2018 FIFA World Cup qualification. His second goal came five days later, scoring a header in a 1–0 friendly win against Macedonia. In December 2018, he was called up for the 2019 AFC Asian Cup squad. He played the whole 90 minutes in all three group stage matches, however Lebanon wasn't able to reach the knock-out stages of the tournament. 

On 5 September 2019, the Lebanese Football Association (LFA) announced Oumari's indefinite exclusion from the national team, alongside teammate Bassel Jradi, for refusing a call-up for a 2022 FIFA World Cup qualifying match against North Korea. After issuing an apology explaining his reasons for refusing the call-up, the LFA lifted the exclusion and Oumari was reintegrated to the national team on 19 September 2019.

On 5 June 2021, Oumari scored two goals against Sri Lanka, including a scissor kick, to help Lebanon win 3–2 in the 2022 World Cup qualifying game. He was voted West Asia Player of the Month of June by the AFC for his performance.

Style of play
Oumari's strengths lie mainly in his physicality and aerial threat. In 2008, his former coach Dietmar Demuth stated that Joan Oumari, aged 20, had a "frighting commitment and aggressiveness", as well as "the maturity of an experienced footballer".

Career statistics

Club

International

Scores and results list Lebanon's goal tally first, score column indicates score after each Oumari goal.

Honours
Reinickendorfer Füchse
 Berlin-Liga: 2007–08

SV Babelsberg 03
 Regionalliga Nord: 2009–10
 Brandenburg Cup: 2008–09

Al-Nasr
 UAE President's Cup runner up: 2016–17

Vissel Kobe
 Emperor's Cup: 2019

FC Tokyo
 J.League Cup: 2020

Individual
 IFFHS All-time Lebanon Men's Dream Team
 Brandenburg U21 player: 2008

See also
 List of Lebanon international footballers
 List of Lebanon international footballers born outside Lebanon
 List of association football families

References

External links

 
 
 Joan Oumari at UAE Pro-League (in Arabic)
 
 

1988 births
Living people
Footballers from Berlin
Lebanese people of Kurdish descent
German people of Kurdish descent
German people of Lebanese descent
Lebanese footballers
German footballers
Kurdish sportspeople
Association football central defenders
Füchse Berlin Reinickendorf players
SV Babelsberg 03 players
FC Rot-Weiß Erfurt players
FSV Frankfurt players
Sivasspor footballers
Al-Nasr SC (Dubai) players
Sagan Tosu players
Vissel Kobe players
FC Tokyo players
Regionalliga players
3. Liga players
2. Bundesliga players
Süper Lig players
TFF First League players
UAE Pro League players
J1 League players
Lebanon international footballers
2019 AFC Asian Cup players
Lebanese expatriate footballers
Lebanese expatriate sportspeople in Turkey
Lebanese expatriate sportspeople in the United Arab Emirates
Lebanese expatriate sportspeople in Japan
German expatriate footballers
German expatriate sportspeople in Turkey
German expatriate sportspeople in the United Arab Emirates
German expatriate sportspeople in Japan
Expatriate footballers in Turkey
Expatriate footballers in the United Arab Emirates
Expatriate footballers in Japan